The Maelstrom International Fantastic Film Festival (MIFFF) was a three day international genre film festival held annually in Seattle, Washington. MIFFF was the premiere Pacific northwest event devoted to action, animation, fantasy, horror and science fiction cinema from around the globe. The Seattle International Film Festival (SIFF) Cinema at McCaw Hall hosted MIFFF which resided on the campus of Seattle Center.

Overview

The "Founding Fathers" of MIFFF are Eric Morgret, Isaac Alexander, Rick Tillman, Gabe de los Angeles & Dan Doody. The festival was first conceived at a gathering in June 2008, which led to the first event taking place in September 2009. The event was created to offer exposure to films that traditionally are overlooked by the mainstream festival circuit from genres including action, animation, fantasy, horror, and science fiction. The vision drew inspiration from other genre film festivals around the globe such as Fantasia Festival in Montreal, Fantastic Fest in Austin, and the first genre film festival, the Sitges Film Festival in Catalonia.  MIFFF was registered shortly thereafter as a Washington State non-profit and acts as the parent organization of the Maelstrom International Fantastic Film Festival. The festival featured a diverse selection of cult genre cinema from around the globe – with the possibility of artists presenting the works themselves.

Current & upcoming festivals

2011
The third annual MIFFF was held September 16–18, 2011 at the SIFF Cinema at McCaw Hall in Seattle, Washington. The festival showcased five feature films and 49 short films from around the world.

Feature films presented
 Absentia
 Boy Wonder
 The Melancholy Fantastic
 Midnight Son
 The Selling

Short films presented

 A Penny Earned
 Air
 Alley Dog
 Alone
 Antedon
 Arthur
 The Astronaut on the Roof
 Blind Luck
 Brutal Relax
 Call of Nature
 Cankered & Cursed
 Cosas Feas (Nasty Stuff)
 Dead Friends
 La Doncella Dormida (The Sleeping Maiden)
 Doppelganger
 Earthship
 Employé du Mois (Employee of the Month)
 Entanglement
 Escape Of The Gingerbread Man
 Fábrica de Muñecas (Dolls Factory)
 Facing Rupert
 Fitness Class Zombie
 The Girl and the Fox
 High Fashion
 Idle Worship
 Juan Con Miedo (Fearful John)
 Junk
 Junk Bonds: The Return of Junkbucket (trailer)
 Lonely
 Loom
 Mongrel's Creed
 Nullarbor
 Paths of Hate
 Payload
 Pharos
 Pinball
 Rantdog's Top Ten Zombies Ever
 R.O.A.C.H.
 Rosa
 Sharfik
 O Solitário Ataque de Vorgon (Vorgon's Lonesome Raid)
 Status
 Suffer
 Switch
 Toy House
 La Tragedia del Hombre Hueco (The Hollow Man's Tragedy)
 Vicenta
 The Waking
 The Year of the Child

Awards
 Best Feature (Audience Award): Boy Wonder
 Best Feature (Jury Award): Absentia
 Best Animation Short (Audience & Jury Award): Nullarbor
 Best Fantasy Short (Audience Award): Employe du Mois
 Best Fantasy Short (Jury Award): Arthur
 Best Horror Short (Audience & Jury Award): Brutal Relax
 Best Sci-Fi Short (Audience Award): Mongrel's Creed
 Best Sci-Fi Short (Jury Award): Status

Past festivals

2010
The second annual MIFFF was held September 17–19, 2010 at the SIFF Cinema at McCaw Hall in Seattle, Washington.
The festival showcased 4 feature films and 41 short films from around the world.

Feature films presented
 Blood River
 Mørke Sjeler (Dark Souls)
 The Presence
 Srpski Film (A Serbian Film)

Short films presented

 A Complex Villainelle
 The Abaddon File
 Alice Jacobs Is Dead
 Babylon 2084
 Billy Baxter and the Mystery of Dr. Amazo
 Clemency
 Cockpit: The Rule of Engagement
 ConLang
 The Cow Who Wanted to Be a Hamburger
 DemiUrge Emesis
 Dracula's Daughter vs The Space Brains
 Ducked and Covered: A Survival Guide to the Post Apocalypse
 Elder Sign
 The Familiar
 Father and Sister
 Flat Love
 Flowers for Norma
 The Hatter's Apprentice
 The Hollow Girl
 Journey Quest
 Kidnap
 The Lift
 Love Does Grow on Trees
 The Macabre World of Lavender Williams
 Manual Práctico del Amigo Imaginario(A Practical Guide for Imaginary Friends (abridged))
 The Necronomicon
 No Escape
 Noirville
 One Small Step
 Porque Hay Costas Que Nunca Se Olvidan (Because There Are Things We Never Forget)
 Red Revenge
 Rise of the Living Corpse
 Scottish Ninjas
 Slap Back Jack: High Five Master
 ST: Phoenix
 Street Angel
 SuperBattle (Episode 1)
 The 3rd Letter
 Thy Kill Be Done
 Toothnapped
 Two Men, Two Cows, Two Guns

Awards
 Best Feature: The Presence
 Best Action Short: Street Angel
 Best Animation Short: A Complex Villainelle
 Best Fantasy Short: Manual Practico del Amigo Imaginario (abreviado)
 Best Horror Short: The Familiar
 Best Sci-Fi Short: Babylon 2084

2009
The first MIFFF was held September 18–20, 2009 at the SIFF Cinema at McCaw Hall in Seattle, Washington.
The festival showcased 6 feature films and 33 short films from around the world.

Feature films presented
 The Ends Of The Earth
 Pig Hunt
 The Revenant
 Strigoi - (West Coast Premier)
 TimeTravel_0
 Until The Light Takes Us

Short films presented

 aQua ad lavandum - in brevi
 The Auburn Hills Breakdown
 Badewanne zum Glück (Bathtub To Happiness)
 Cheerbleeders
 Dead Bones
 Death In Charge
 The Delivery
 Egg Robot Momo
 Enigma
 Enter the Sandbox
 Fantastic Magnifico
 Firemount
 Foet
 La Glacière Rouge(The Red Icebox)
 Greenspoke
 Gul(Flower)
 Hart
 The Horribly Slow Murderer with the Extremely Inefficient Weapon
 The Kirkie
 Lazarus Taxon
 Mr. Gun
 Milbe(Mite)
 Die Schneider Krankheit(The Schneider Disease)
 Skylight
 Sunday
 Thirsty
 The Tree Man
 Tropezones
 The Ugly File
 The Urge
 Virtual Dating
 Der Weltenbauer(The Builder Of Worlds)
 X-Mess Detritus

Awards
 Best Feature: Strigoi
 Best Sci-Fi Short: Kirkie
 Best Horror Short: Death in Charge
 Best Fantasy Short: Hart
 Best Animation Short: Enter the Sandbox

Official Festival Posters

Other genre film festivals

 Fantasia Festival
 Fantastic Fest
 Science Fiction Fantasy Short Film Festival
 Puchon International Fantastic Film Festival
 Screamfest Horror Film Festival
 Yubari International Fantastic Film Festival
 European Fantastic Film Festivals Federation
 Amsterdam Fantastic Film Festival, Amsterdam
 Brussels International Festival of Fantasy Film
 Espoo Ciné International Film Festival
 Fantafestival
 Fantasporto, Porto
 Festival de Cine de Sitges
 Leeds International Film Festival
 Lund International Fantastic Film Festival
 Neuchâtel International Fantastic Film Festival
 Dead by Dawn
 FrightFest
 Festival européen du Film Fantastique de Strasbourg
 Horrorthon Film Festival, Dublin
 International Week of Fantastic Film
 NatFilm Festival, Copenhagen
 Ravenna Nightmare Film Festival, Ravenna
 Riga International Fantasy Film Festival, Riga
 Sitges Film Festival, San Sebastián
 Trieste International Science Fiction Film Festival, Trieste
 Utopiales - Festival International de Science-Fiction de Nantes

References

External links
 
 Official MIFFF Twitter Feed
 Official MIFFF Facebook
 Official MIFFF Flickr Feed
 SIFF Cinema at McCaw Hall

Fantasy and horror film festivals in the United States
Seattle Area conventions
Festivals in Seattle
Culture of Seattle
Film festivals in Washington (state)
Film festivals established in 2009
Science fiction film festivals